Ogle is an unincorporated community in Clay County, Kentucky, United States.
There is no town.
It does not appear on the 1900 census, where people are listed rather as living in Otter Creek.
The origin of the name is unknown.
The Ogle post office was established in April 1893, with Morris Jackson as the first postmaster.

Cross-reference

Sources

Further reading 

 

Unincorporated communities in Clay County, Kentucky
Unincorporated communities in Kentucky